Burkov is a Russian male surname, its feminine counterpart is Burkova. Notable people with the surname include:

Dmitry Burkov (born 1960), Russian Internet entrepreneur and businessman 
Georgi Burkov (1933–1990), Russian film actor
Alexander Burkov (born 1967), Russian politician

Russian-language surnames